Daniel Francois Fyfer (born 28 February 1955) is a Zimbabwean judoka. He competed in the men's half-lightweight event at the 1980 Summer Olympics.

References

External links
 

1955 births
Living people
Zimbabwean male judoka
Olympic judoka of Zimbabwe
Judoka at the 1980 Summer Olympics
Place of birth missing (living people)